Joseph Damer, 1st Earl of Dorchester (12 March 1718 – 12 January 1798) was a country landowner and politician who sat in the House of Commons from 1741 to 1762 when he was raised to the peerage as Baron Milton. He was particularly associated with the reshaping of Milton Abbey and the creation of the village of Milton Abbas in Dorset, south-west England.

Early life
Damer was the eldest son of Joseph Damer MP of Winterbourne Came, and his wife Mary Churchill, daughter of John Churchill of Henbury, Dorset. He was from a wealthy family and his great-uncle was a money-lender in Ireland. He was baptised at the Holy Trinity Church, Dorchester and educated at Trinity College, Dublin in 1734–5. He married Lady Caroline Sackville, daughter of the 1st Duke of Dorset on 27 July 1742.

Political career
Damer was returned as Member of Parliament (MP) for Weymouth in the 1741 general election at the age of 22. He was then returned for Bramber in the 1747 general election and Dorchester in the 1754 general election. Damer was created Baron Milton of Shrone Hill, Tipperary, Ireland on 3 July 1753 and Baron Milton of Milton Abbey on 10 May 1762.

Building
In 1751, Damer commissioned architect John Vardy to build him a London residence on Park Lane. He also purchased Milton Abbey and embarked on an ambitious project to reshape the surrounding valley. He replaced some existing buildings at the Abbey with a mansion house (designed initially by Vardy, then by Sir William Chambers, and completed by James Wyatt) for his own use. Landscape gardener Capability Brown was commissioned to remodel the surrounding grounds.

As a wealthy landowner Damer also set about the systematic removal of the neighbouring small town of Middleton and its residents. The original town was razed to the ground and landscaped, most of the site disappearing beneath a new ornamental lake.

Later life and legacy
Damer's wife Lady Caroline died on 24 March 1775 at the age of 57, and he commissioned the Italian sculptor Agostino Carlini to create a magnificent tomb to her memory in the Abbey Church. In politics he had been associated with his brother-in-law, Lord George Sackville, and from 1768 to 1775 with Rockingham, but upon his wife's death he spent a period in seclusion. In 1778 he returned to political life and took up a violent animosity against the Americans in their war of independence.

Damer was created first Earl of Dorchester and Viscount Milton on 18 May 1792. His income was variously estimated at between £15,000 and £30,000 a year. Horace Walpole in 1774 described him as "the most arrogant and proud of men", and Wraxall wrote of him: "At his seat of Milton Abbey in Dorsetshire, where he maintained a gloomy and sequestered splendour, analogous to his character and habits, he had made immense landed purchases, which, exhausting his pecuniary means, extensive as they were, reduced him to a species of temporary distress."

Damer died in 1798. He and his wife Caroline had three sons. The eldest, John, born in 1744, married the sculptor Anne Seymour Conway in 1767. She separated from him after seven years. Deep in debt, John Damer shot himself in 1776. The second son, George, born 1746, was also an MP and succeeded his father as Earl of Dorchester, but died unmarried in 1808, whereupon the title became extinct and the estate passed to his sister, Caroline.

Damer's Park Lane mansion became known as The Dorchester. It was replaced by an Italianate building during the mid-19th century, but the name lives on as it is now the site of the Dorchester Hotel.

Notes

External links
 Joseph Damer and the town of Milton

|-

Damer, Joseph
Earls in the Peerage of Great Britain
1718 births
1798 deaths
Damer, Joseph
Milton, Joseph Damer, 1st Baron
Milton, Joseph Damer, 1st Baron
English landowners
Members of the Privy Council of Ireland
Peers of Ireland created by George II
Peers of Great Britain created by George III
Dawson-Damer family